Zee Tamil is an Indian Tamil language general entertainment pay television channel owned by Zee Entertainment Enterprises. The channel started broadcasting on 2008 and is available internationally. The channel broadcasts from Guindy, Chennai, Tamil Nadu.

Zee Entertainment Enterprises also launched a full Tamil movie channel named Zee Thirai in 2020.

History

Zee Tamil was launched on 12 October 2008 as the third south Indian channel after Telugu and Kannada counterparts (Zee Telugu and Zee Kannada). It was launched under Zee Entertainment Enterprises.

In Canada, the channel is distributed by Ethnic Channels Group.

Zee Tamil went on a revamp with an update in its on-air graphics on 15 October 2017 with the slogan of "Let's bridge heart and welcome change (மனதால் இணைவோம் மாற்றத்தை வரவேற்போம்), along with the launch of a high-definition feed with Tamil film actress Jyothika as the brand ambassador. The rebranding coincided with the Zee Network's silver jubilee celebrations where all the network channels donned a new look.

On 19 September 2018, Astro Added "Samrat" Pack Customers, Zee Tamil HD (Channel 232) and purchase until October 2018.

On 19 January 2020, its siblings channel Zee Thirai was launched, which airs non-stop Kollywood films. This Movie Channel was released by actor Kamal Haasan at the grand stage of Zee Cine Awards Tamil (2020).

Logos

Programming

Zee Tamil programming includes serials, spiritual shows, cookery, talk shows, musical shows, movies and events. It telecasts fantasy and romance serials. Zee Tamil also telecasts reality shows like Dance Jodi Dance, Genes, Sa Re Ga Ma Pa Seniors, Survivor Tamil, Tamizha Tamizha and Rockstar.

Ratings
In 2017, after the channel went through a complete revamp the shares rose from 5% to between 13% and 15% in that year. Making Zee Tamil the second most watched Tamil television channel.

Zee Tamil created history by beating Sun TV Programs. For a first time a non- Sun TV Program entered into Top 5 BARC Programs of Zee Tamil Sembaruthi. 

Again Zee Tamil created history that a Non-Sun TV Premiere Movie 2.0 entered into Top 5 BARC Programs.

References

External links
 Zee Tamizh Official website

Television stations in Chennai
Tamil-language television channels
Foreign television channels broadcasting in the United Kingdom
Zee Entertainment Enterprises
Television channels and stations established in 2008
2008 establishments in Tamil Nadu